The 2018 Lamar Hunt U.S. Open Cup was the 105th edition of the U.S. Open Cup, a knockout cup competition in American soccer. It is the oldest ongoing competition in the United States and was contested by 97 teams from leagues in the U.S. system.

The 97 entrants included the 20 American clubs from Major League Soccer and 22 non-affiliated American clubs in the United Soccer League. The qualification tournament, held in 2017, determined the 13 teams from local amateur leagues. The 20 entrants from the Premier Development League and 19 of the 22 from the National Premier Soccer League were determined based on results achieved in those leagues in 2017. Cash prizes and travel reimbursement costs were also increased for the 2018 edition. Sporting Kansas City was the defending champion but were not able to successfully defend the title, losing in the quarterfinals to Houston Dynamo.

The 2018 tournament initially excluded clubs from the North American Soccer League, which suspended operations for the year, but a decision by the Open Cup Committee in March 2018 allowed for the entry of NPSL teams Jacksonville Armada FC, Miami FC 2, and New York Cosmos B as part of an added play-in round, which brought the total number of NPSL teams participating in the tournament to 22.

Qualification

 $: Winner of $25,000 bonus for advancing the furthest in the competition from their respective divisions. 
 $$: Winner of $100,000 for being the runner-up in the competition.
 $$$: Winner of $300,000 for winning the competition.

Brackets 
Host team listed firstBold = winner* = after extra time, = penalty shootout score

Match details
All times local to game site.

Play-in round
Draw announced April 4.

First round
Draw announced April 4.

Second round
Draw announced April 11.

Third round
Draw announced May 14.

Fourth round
Draw announced May 24.

Round of 16
Draw announced June 7.

Quarter-finals
Draw announced June 7.

Semi-finals
Draw announced July 23.

Final

Top goalscorers

References

External links
  at U.S. Soccer
 U.S. Open Cup match center at United Soccer League
 TheCup.us, an independent news site covering the U.S. Open Cup

 
U.S. Open Cup
U.S. Open Cup